Vednita Carter is an American anti-sex trafficking activist, author, and executive director of the "Breaking Free" organization which helps women escape prostitution.

Biography 
Carter grew up in Twin Cities, Minnesota. Unable to afford college, she responded to an ad looking for dancers, which turned out to be an ad looking for strippers. Carter saw many women in her profession migrate to prostitution, she said it was a "stepping stone to prostitution". She worked in the industry for a year before she was able to escape.

In 1989, Carter began to work with women in prostitution in Minnesota at a different agency, which later closed, and became program director. In 1996, Carter founded Breaking Free, an organization that aids girls and women in exiting prostitution. She subsequently became this organization's executive director, and the program expanded to offer more support, including: "emergency services such as food, clothing, shelter, medical assistance, legal assistance to victims of trafficking". By 1998, the organization rented an apartment block to permanently re-house women and girls, and by 2010, they had more apartments and three "transitional houses". In 2015, the housing block named "Jerry's Place", after Sgt. Gerald Vick, was closed due to funding issues.

In their book Juvenile Justice: Advancing Research, Policy, and Practice, Francine Sherman and Francine Jacobs call Carter "a leading service provider for exploited women and girls".

Carter has been published in Hastings Women's Law Journal, the Michigan Journal of Gender and Law, and the Journal of Trauma Practice. Carter contributed the piece "Prostitution = Slavery" to the 2003 anthology Sisterhood Is Forever: The Women's Anthology for a New Millennium, edited by Robin Morgan.

Activism 
In 1996, Carter founded the organization Breaking Free. Breaking Free is a non-profit organization based in St. Paul, Minnesota with the goal of helping women escape prostitution. Breaking Free provides a variety of services to the women. These services include food, clothing, and emotional support. Breaking Free also provides addiction services, permanent and temporary housing, as well as legal assistance and job training. The services are offered with no strings attached.

Since 1996, Breaking Free has helped over 6,000 women.

Carter also established a "John School", which educates men arrested for solicitation about the effects of their actions to persuade them not to solicit again. Carter believes that as long as men continue to purchase sexual favors, sex trafficking will not end.

Awards 
Carter won the 2010 Survivor Centered-Service Provider category from the Norma Hotaling Award.

Carter was one of six women granted the Women of Distinction award by Century College in 2012.

Carter was awarded the Path Breaker Award from Shared Hope International in 2014. That same year, she was also named a CNN Hero.

In 2015, she was awarded an honorary Doctorate of Divinity, Ambassador-at-Large and Chaplaincy from CICAInternational University and Seminary.

Selected bibliography

Chapters in books 
  Details.
 
  Pdf.

Journal articles 
  Pdf. 
  Pdf.

References

Living people
Year of birth missing (living people)
20th-century births
African-American women writers
African-American non-fiction writers
American non-fiction writers
American feminist writers
Writers from Denver
Black feminism
African-American activists
African-American feminists
American women's rights activists
Human trafficking in the United States
American female erotic dancers
American erotic dancers
Anti-prostitution feminists
Feminist studies scholars
Sex industry researchers
Women social scientists
African-American abolitionists
Anti–human trafficking activists
Dancers from Minnesota
American women non-fiction writers
Anti-prostitution activists in the United States
21st-century American women
Women civil rights activists
21st-century African-American women
20th-century African-American people
20th-century African-American women